Ship measurements consist of a multitude of terms and definitions specifically related to ships and measuring or defining their characteristics.

Definitions
Beam - A measure of the width of the ship. There are two types:

Beam, Overall (BOA), commonly referred to simply as Beam - The overall width of the ship measured at the widest point of the nominal waterline.

Beam on Centerline (BOC) - Used for multihull vessels. The BOC for vessels is measured as follows: For a catamaran: the perpendicular distance from the centerline of one hull to the centerline of the other hull, measured at deck level. For a trimaran: the perpendicular distance between the centerline of the main hull and the centerline of either ama, measured at deck level. This term in typically used in conjunction with LOA (Length overall; see below). The ratio of LOA/BOC is used to estimate the stability of multihull vessels. The lower the ratio the greater the boat's stability.

Carlin - similar to a beam, except running in a fore and aft direction.

Complement - The full number of people required to operate a ship. Includes officers and crew; does not include passengers. For warships, the number of people assigned to a ship in peacetime may be considerably less than her full complement.

Cube - The cargo carrying capacity of a ship, measured in cubic metres or feet. There are two common types:

Bale Cube (or Bale Capacity)- The space available for cargo measured in cubic metres or feet to the inside of the cargo battens, on the frames, and to the underside of the beams. It is a measurement of capacity for cargo in bales or pallets, etc, where the cargo does not conform to the shape of the ship.

Grain Cube (or Grain Capacity)- The maximum space available for cargo measured in cubic metres or feet, the measurement being taken to the inside of the shell plating of the ship or to the outside of the frames and to the top of the beam or underside of the deck plating. It is a measurement of capacity for cargoes such as grain, where the cargo flows to conform to the shape of the ship.

Displacement - A measurement of the weight or mass of the vessel, at a given draught. 
(Merchant ships display gross tonnage ; see tonnage), deadweight and the number of items it can carry i.e. TEU 20 ft equivalent units. Displacement is expressed in Tonne (metric unit) ship built for USA will be in imperial tons, Warships are shown in displacement tons or tonne. To preserve secrecy, nations sometimes misstate a warship's displacement.

Lightweight displacement - LWD -  The weight or mass of the ship excluding cargo, fuel, ballast, stores, passengers, and crew, but with water in the boilers to steaming level.

Loadline displacement -  The weight or mass of the ship loaded to the load line or plimsoll mark.

Deadweight tonne (DWT) -  The total that the vessel can carry that is cargo, fuel, ballast, people and stores.

Draft or draught (d) or (T) - The vertical distance from the bottom of the keel to the waterline. Used mainly to determine the minimum water depth for safe passage of a vessel and to calculate the vessels displacement (obtained from ships stability tables) so as to determine the mass of cargo on board.

Draft, Air -  Air Draft/Draught is the distance from the water line to the highest point on a ship (including antennas) while it is loaded. Air draft is the minimum height a ship needs to pass under, while standard draft is the minimum depth a ship needs float over.

Length between perpendiculars - The distance between where the forward part cuts the waterline and the rudder post of the ship.

Length Overall (LOA) - The maximum length of the ship between the ship's extreme points important for berthing purposes.

Length at Waterline (LWL) - The ship's length measured at the waterline

Shaft Horsepower (SHP) - The amount of mechanical power delivered by the engine to a propeller shaft. One horsepower is equivalent to 746 Watts.

Tonnage - a number derived from any of several methods to calculate the volume or other number indicative of a ship's cargo carrying capacity.

Gross tonnage - GT - Not expressible in units of mass or weight but is based on the total volume of the vessel in cubic meter with a formula applied. GT replaced Gross register tonnage (GRT) which is now an obsolete unit.

Net tonnage - NT - Not expressible in units of mass or weight but is based on the cargo volume of the vessel in cubic meter with a formula applied.  NT replaced Net register tonnage (NRT) which is now an obsolete unit.

See also
 Metrics
 Ship size categories
 List of Panamax ports

References
 The Oxford Companion To Ships & The Sea, by I. C. B. Dear and Peter Kemp.  Oxford University Press, 1979.  
 Ton types, by Gregory M. Walsh, from Ocean Navigator Online.
  U.S. Military Sealift Command  Glossary of ship terms
 How do you "weigh" a ship? from navweaps.com

External links 
Tanker ships
Ship sizes 

 
Nautical terminology

de:Schiffsmaße